The 2015 Big Ten Conference Men's Ice Hockey Tournament was the second tournament in conference history played between March 19 and March 21, 2015 at Joe Louis Arena in Detroit, Michigan. The winner of the tournament was the Minnesota Golden Gophers, who earned the Big Ten's automatic bid to the 2015 NCAA Division I Men's Ice Hockey Tournament.

Format
All six Big Ten teams participated in the tournament, which was a single-elimination format. Teams were seeded No. 1 through No. 6 according to the final regular season conference standings. In the quarterfinals, No. 3 played No. 6 and No. 4 played No. 5. In the semifinals, No. 2 played the winner of the first game and No. 1 played the winner of the second game (the teams were not reseeded). The two semifinal winners played each other in the Championship Game.

Conference standings
Note: GP = Games played; W = Wins; L = Losses; T = Ties; PTS = Points; GF = Goals For; GA = Goals Against

Bracket

Note: * denotes overtime periods.

Quarterfinals
All times are local (EST) (UTC−4).

(4) Penn State vs. (5) Ohio State

(3) Michigan vs. (6) Wisconsin

Semifinals

(1) Minnesota vs. (5) Ohio State

(2) Michigan State vs. (3) Michigan

Championship

(1) Minnesota vs. (3) Michigan

Tournament awards

Most Outstanding Player
 Goaltender: Adam Wilcox

All-Tournament Team
 Goaltender: Adam Wilcox (Minnesota)
 Defensemen: Michael Downing (Michigan), Mike Reilly (Minnesota)
 Forwards: Zach Hyman (Michigan), Travis Boyd (Minnesota), Kyle Rau (Minnesota)

References

External links
 Big Ten Tournament information

Big Ten Men's Ice Hockey Tournament
Big Ten Men's Ice Hockey Tournament